Pasqualina "Lina" Sastri is an Italian actress and singer.

Life and career
Born in Naples, Lina Sastri started acting in amateur dramatics at very young age. She made her professional debut with the theatrical company Teatro Libero, and had her breakout in 1974, starring in the musical drama Masaniello. On stage, she worked intensively with Giuseppe Patroni Griffi, and her collaborations include Eduardo De Filippo, Fabio Carpi and Memè Perlini. 

Sastri made her film debut in Il prefetto di ferro, in 1977. In 1984 she won a Silver Ribbon for Best Actress and a David di Donatello in the same category for her performance in Mi manda Picone. One year later, she won the same two awards for her role in Segreti segreti. In 1987 she was awarded with a David di Donatello for Best Supporting Actress for Damiano Damiani's L'inchiesta.

As a singer she has released numerous albums, mainly sung in the Neapolitan dialect. She participated at the Sanremo Festival in 1992 with the song "Femmene 'e mare". She considers herself Roman Catholic.

Partial filmography

 Lu curaggio de nu pumpiero napulitano (1974)
 Li nepute de lu sinneco (1975)
 'O tuono 'e marzo (1975)
 Il prefetto di ferro (1977)
 Ecce bombo (1978) - Olga
 Café Express (1980) – Suor Camilla
 Hearts and Armour (1983) – La Maga
 Where's Picone? (1984) – Luciella
 Secrets Secrets (1985) – Laura
 La donna delle meraviglie (1985) – Luisa
 The Inquiry (1987) – Mary of Magdala
 Le lunghe ombre (1987)
 La posta in gioco (1988) – Renata Fonte
 The Strangeness of Life (1988) – Renata Fonte
 Little Misunderstandings (1989) – Francesca
 Luisa, Carla, Lorenza e... le affettuose lontananze (1989) – Luisa
 Brown Bread Sandwiches (1989) – Giulia Buonanotte
 Women in Arms (1991)
 Celluloide (1996) – Anna Magnani
 Strangled Lives (1996) – Sauro
 Li chiamarono... briganti! (1999) – Corifea
 Excellent Cadavers (1999) – Mamma
 Giovani (2002) – Irene
 Saint John Bosco: Mission to Love (2004, TV Movie) – Margherita Bosco
 Saint Rita (2004, TV Movie) – Abbess
 Fabbrica (2005) – Madre Lina
 Imperium: Saint Peter (2005, TV Movie) – Mary
 Don't Waste Your Time, Johnny! (2007) – Vincenza Ciaramella
 K. Il bandito (2008) – Rita Santoro
 Baarìa (2009) – Tana / Beggard
 Passione (2010)
 Poker Generation (2012) – Lucia
 To Rome with Love (2012) – Friend at Cinema
 Discovery at Dawn (2012) – Marianna Dall'Acqua
 O sangue è quente da Bahia (2013)
 My Italy (2016)
 Prigioniero della mia libertà (2016) – G.I.P.
 Napoli velata (2017) – Ludovica
 Buon Lavoro (2018)

References

External links 
 

1950 births
Italian film actresses
Italian women singers
Living people
Musicians from Naples
David di Donatello winners
Nastro d'Argento winners
ZYX Music artists
Italian Roman Catholics